Sielmingen is a former municipality in the Esslingen district, in Baden-Württemberg, Germany.

It was first recorded in year 1275 as Sygehelmingen.

In 1975 it was merged with the municipalities Bernhausen, Bonlanden, Plattenhardt and Harthausen to form the new town Filderstadt. Sielmingen is today a quartier of that town, formally named Filderstadt-Sielmingen. It has 7,566 inhabitants.

Villages in Baden-Württemberg
Former municipalities in Baden-Württemberg